The District of Horta was a district of the  (Adjacent Islands, the former collective name for the Azores and Madeira), consisting of the dependent western islands of the Azores, located in the Atlantic Ocean. The district of Horta, not to be confused with the modern municipality of Horta, existed from 1836 until 1976 when it was abolished in favour of the autonomy charter of the 1975 Portuguese Constitution.

History
During these reforms  the Azores were redesignated dependencies of Portugal as the constitutionally-designated  (Adjacent Islands).

District autonomy was established during the Estado Novo regime of António de Oliveira Salazar in 1940.

With regional autonomy the districts were completely abolished: the 1976 Portuguese constitution defined in law the status of Autonomous Region without the existence of districts. Local government authority and administration fell to the upper-level local administrative units (the municipalities) and second-tier LAU IIs (the civil parishes).

Geography
The district of Horta included the western and the southern central islands of the Azores: Corvo, Flores, Faial and Pico. This region includes a land area of 776.17 km² of islands and islets, and the following municipalities:
Corvo
Horta
Lajes das Flores
Lajes do Pico
Madalena
São Roque do Pico

References

Former subdivisions of the Azores
Horta, Azores
History of the Azores